Cape Gantheaume Conservation Park, formerly the Cape Gantheaume National Park, is a protected area in the Australian state of South Australia located on the south coast of Kangaroo Island. Attractions include Murray Lagoon and D'Estrees Bay.

Extent

History
The conservation park was first dedicated as a protected area in 1971 and then again in 1972 following the enactment of the National Parks and Wildlife Act 1972. In 1993, a large portion of the conservation park was excised and proclaimed as the Cape Gantheaume Wilderness Protection Area.

Visitor services
Camping facilities are available at both Murray Lagoon and D'Estrees Bay. As of 2009, four dedicated walking trails are available at both Murray Lagoon and D'Estrees Bay. These are qualified as being 'easy', 'even surfaced...' and 'suitable for small children'.

See also
Protected areas of South Australia
Caladenia tensa

References

External links
Cape Gantheaume Conservation Park webpage on protected planet

Conservation parks of South Australia
Protected areas of Kangaroo Island
1971 establishments in Australia
Protected areas established in 1971